Mark Pryor (born 1963) is a United States Senator.

Mark Pryor may also refer to:

 Mark Pryor (author) (born 1967), British mystery writer and Assistant District Attorney for Travis County, Texas
 M.G.M. Pryor (1915–1970), British entomologist

See also
 Mark Prior (born 1980), professional baseball player
 Pryor (disambiguation)